The BMW B38 is a  turbocharged straight-three DOHC petrol engine, which replaced the straight-four BMW N13. Production started in 2013.

It specifically shares a lot of components with the BMW B37, due to their same size/configuration. 

The B38 is used in front-wheel drive cars (such as the Mini Hatch and BMW 2 Series Active Tourer), as well as BMW's traditional rear-wheel drive and all-wheel drive (xDrive) configurations. The first car to use the B38 is the BMW i8 hybrid sports coupé, where it is used as a transverse mid-mounted engine.

Design 
The B38 features direct injection, an 11:1 compression ratio, variable valve timing (double-VANOS) and the twin-power turbo turbocharger with the world's first aluminium turbine housing, manufactured by Continental.

Models

B38A12U0 
Applications:

 version:
 2014–current F55/F56 Mini One First

 version:
 2014–2018 F55/F56 Mini One

B38A15M0 / B38B15M0 (B38A15M1/B38B15M1 for post-2018 manufactured engines) 
Applications:

 version:
 2015–current BMW F45/F46 216i Active Tourer / Gran Tourer
 2018–current F55/F56 Mini One

 version:
 2015–2019 BMW F20/F21 116i

 version (104kW (141bhp) for post-2018 manufacture)
 2015–2019 BMW F20/F21 118i
 2015–current BMW F22/F23 218i coupe / convertible
 2014–current BMW F45/F46 218i Active Tourer / Gran Tourer
 2015–2019 BMW F30/F31 318i LCI
 2015–current BMW F48 X1 sDrive18i
 2014–current Mini F55/F56/F57 Cooper
 2015–2019 Mini F54 Clubman
 2017–current Mini F60 Countryman
 2017–current BMW F39 X2 sDrive18i
 2017–current BMW F45 225xe Active Tourer (PHEV)
 2019–current BMW F40 118i
 2019–current BMW F44 218i Gran Coupé
 2020–current BMW F39 xDrive25e

B38K15T0 
Applications:
 2013–2020 BMW I12 i8
 2020–present Karma Revero GT/GTS

References 

b37
Gasoline engines by model
Straight-three engines